"Touch Myself" is the debut solo single by American singer Tionne "T-Boz" Watkins for the soundtrack album to the film Fled, starring Laurence Fishburne and Stephen Baldwin. It was released by Rowdy Records as the album's lead single on July 18, 1996. The accompanying music video was directed by Bille Woodruff, and was made both with and without clips from the film.

A remix was also made featuring rapper Richie Rich, and produced by Jermaine Dupri. The remix also had a music video which did not contain clips from the movie. In 1997, it was released as the third single from Richie Rich's 1996 album Seasoned Veteran. It peaked at number 40 giving Watkins her first top 40 hit.

Critical reception
Larry Flick from Billboard described the song as a "chugging jeep mover". He added, "With each recording, she sheds a little more of her girlish posture, revealing an assured funk stylist who makes the most of her limited (but hugely appealing) voice. It does not hurt that she has producer Dallas Austin in her corner. He has surrounded her with a sleek rhythm base and jazzy keyboards, not to mention a playfully sexy tune that must have been a blast to record." 

Damien Mendis from Music Week'''s RM'' Dance Update rated the song five out of five, noting that the lead singer from TLC "takes a controversial dip into hot waters with a cool slice of mid-tempo R&B." He felt that written and produced by Austin, "this sounds like a logical follow-up to their killer 'Creep' hit as it bears strong similarities. A lazy jazz guitar replaces the trumpet and the bass guitar twangs a Craig Mack 'Flava' riff over a slinky rhythm lifted from ATCQ's 'Bonita Applebum'. It is instantly familiar as the break the Fugees recently utilised on 'Softly'. The steamy but catchy lyrics will no doubt win her more fans and, hopefully, UK radio won't prove as prudish as the US. (..) Can't wait. I smell a hit."

Charts

Credits and personnel
Credits adapted from the CD single.

Recording and management
Recorded and mixed at DARP Studios (Atlanta, GA)
Mastered at The Hit Factory (New York City, New York)
Contains a sample of "Hey Young World", written by Ricky Walters and performed by Slick Rick, published by Def American Songs, Inc., courtesy of Def Jam Recordings, Inc.
Contains a sample from "Who the Cap Fits", written by Edmund Carl Aiken, Jr. PKA Shinehead, and performed by Shinehead, published by African Love Music/Def American Songs, Inc. under license from African Love Music
Managed by Hiriam Management
Published by EMI April Music Inc., Darp Music (ASCAP)

Personnel

Dallas Austin – writing, production, instrumentation, executive production
Atvi Speights – recording engineer, mixing
Leslie Brathwaite – recording engineering
Carl Glover – recording assistant
Brian Smith – recording assistant
Sol Messiah – scratching
Rick Sheppard – MIDI and sound designing

Debra Killings – background vocals
Chris Gehringer – mastering
Antonio M. Reid – executive production
Kenneth Edmonds – executive production
Perri Reid – executive production
Dah Len – photography
Davett Singletary – creative direction
Christopher Stern – art direction

References

1996 debut singles
Music videos directed by Bille Woodruff
Tionne Watkins songs
Hip hop soul songs
1996 songs
Songs written by Dallas Austin
Rowdy Records singles
LaFace Records singles
Arista Records singles